Rosalind Patricia-Anne Howells, Baroness Howells of St Davids  COG (born 10 January 1931) is a British Labour politician, who formerly served as member of the House of Lords.

Having been awarded an OBE in the 1994 New Year's Honours, she was made a Life peer as Baroness Howells of St Davids, of Charlton in the London Borough of Greenwich on 21 July 1999. The name St Davids refers to the parish in Grenada where she was brought up, to the south-east of the island. She retired from the House of Lords on 10 January 2019.

Life and career
Howells was educated at St Joseph's College, Reading, South West London College and the University of the District of Columbia in Washington, D.C. In 1955, she married John Charles Howells and they have two daughters.

Howells served as the Director of the Greenwich Racial Equality Council as well as a Community and Equal Opportunities Worker. Baroness Howells is a trustee of the Stephen Lawrence Charitable Trust, and served as the unofficial advisor to the Lawrence family.

Howells was the first black woman to sit on the GLC's Training Board; the first female member of the Court of Governors of the University of Greenwich and was the Vice Chair at the London Voluntary Service Council. She has worked with the Carnival Liaison Committee, the Greater London Action in Race Equality, and has been an active campaigner for justice in the field of race relations. She is a Trustee of the Jason Roberts Foundation, which aims to provide a range of sporting opportunities for children and young people in the United Kingdom and Grenada.

In March 2009 she was inaugurated as the Chancellor of the University of Bedfordshire in Luton. Baroness Howells is a trustee of St George's University's UK Trust and serves on the board of the Windward Islands Research and Education Foundation (WINDREF), the research institute affiliated with St. George's University.

References

External links
Announcement of her introduction at the House of Lords House of Lords minutes of proceedings, 25 October 1999.
100 Great Black Britons.

1931 births
Living people
Howells of St Davids, Rosalind Howells, Baron
Life peeresses created by Elizabeth II
Officers of the Order of the British Empire
Grenadian emigrants to England
Black British women politicians
People associated with the University of Bedfordshire